Bug estuary is an estuary of the Southern Bug. It is 82 km long and up to 11 km wide. Together with the Dnieper estuary makes Dnieper–Bug estuary, on the northern coast of the Black Sea. The city of Mykolaiv is located on the Bug estuary.

Dnieper–Bug estuary
Estuaries of Ukraine